The Fairy Tale Forest (Afrikaans: sprokieswoud) is a section of Etosha National Park in Kunene Region, Namibia, near Grünewald Farm. It is an open forest of Moringa ovalifolia ("Fairy tale trees").

The largest concentration of Moringa ovalifolia in the world, the forest is 2 km x 2 km in size and is located on a limestone plain covered with sweetgrass. The park's trees have often been damaged by elephant herds in the past, but are now protected from them.

References 

Etosha National Park